Lyudmila Todorova Zhivkova (26 July 1942 – 21 July 1981) was a senior Bulgarian Communist Party functionary and Politburo member. She was the daughter of Bulgarian Communist leader Todor Zhivkov, and primarily known for her interest in preserving and promoting Bulgarian arts and culture on the international stage. Zhivkova was also a controversial figure within the former Soviet Bloc because of her interests in esoteric Eastern religion and spirituality.

Biography

Zhivkova was born in Sofia. She studied history at Sofia University (1965) and history of art at Moscow State University (1970), before researching a book on British-Turkish relations at St Antony's College, Oxford. She then became assistant president of the Committee for Art and Culture (1972–1973), its first vice president (1973–1975) and its president (with the rank of a minister) between 1975 and her death in 1981. Zhivkova was a deputy in the 7th (1976–1981) and 8th (1981) National Assembly of Bulgaria. In her lifetime, Zhivkova published a volume of "collected works" (mostly edited speeches) which was translated into major world languages; her trademark ideas about the need to bring up and educate "rounded personalities" and "imbue public life with beauty" sat awkwardly alongside militant Marxism–Leninism.

Public office

Lyudmila Zhivkova's office as the de facto head of Bulgarian culture brought the nation's artistic community increased freedom at a time when, after the crushing of the Prague Spring, Soviet-bloc Communist orthodoxy was otherwise stricter than ever. Moreover, as daughter of the head of Party and state, Zhivkova was often seen as "heir apparent" and enjoyed powers beyond her official purview. Thus, Zhivkova and her second husband Ivan Slavkov held renowned Friday soirées at their central Sofia apartment, offering opportunities for those with a cause to lobby her father indirectly.

Zhivkova is credited with cutting across red tape and ensuring the rapid construction of Sofia's enormous and very complex National Palace of Culture which opened around the time of her death. Another of her achievements was the opening of Sofia's National Gallery of World Art, for whose collection a large number of foreign paintings and statues were acquired on world markets. In line with her pet idea of "rounded personalities," shortly before her death Zhivkova produced the Banner of Peace world children's assembly in Sofia under the aegis of Unesco. She also helped establish the 1300 Years of Bulgaria Foundation, a quasi-independent entity to endow the arts.

Alongside bringing foreign culture to Bulgaria, Zhivkova did much to permit and encourage Bulgarian artists to travel abroad for study and practice. She also organised the Thracian Gold Treasures from Bulgaria travelling exhibition which visited over 25 world cities, bringing much acclaim.

Though personally an extreme ascetic, Zhivkova was also indirectly credited with the opening of a number of cafés, restaurants and other establishments which returned a measure of pre-Communist bourgeois grace to Bulgaria's cities.

Great support for the Bulgarian creative arts was another feature of Zhivkova's term as leader of Bulgarian arts. Greater than customary emphasis on indigenous culture alongside great fanfare, marked the 1300th anniversary of Bulgaria.

Private persona

During the last decade of her life, Lyudmila developed intense interests in Eastern culture, New Age matters, religious mysticism, and the occult. In this connection she developed a very close relationship with "the Petrich Oracle" (Vanga, a famous village clairvoyant), and with thriller-writer Bogomil Raynov, son of a renowned Bulgarian theosophist and writer Nikolay Raynov. Later, Zhivkova allegedly developed additional interests in Native American and particularly native Mexican beliefs and mysticism.  Rumours suggested that she had renounced Marxism and Communist atheism: no mean transgression even for the average Bulgarian at the time and an unthinkable apostasy for a member of the Politburo and a high priestess of the arts, which Communist governments had consistently regarded as being at the very forefront of the "Ideological War".

Roerich year

In connection with her esoteric interests, she designated 1978 "Roerich Year", having encountered like-minded scion of Russian émigrés Svetoslav Roerich in India in 1975. Besides their artistic work as painters, the Roerichs were founders and proponents of Agni Yoga, an idiosyncratic spiritual teaching based on Indian mysticism, so celebrating them so intensively appeared a somewhat eccentric gesture for a Marxist government (admittedly, at the time the Roerichs were respected as artists, patriots and explorers in the USSR as well). A postage stamp with a portrait of Nicholas Roerich by his son Svetoslav was issued in that year.

Death

Lyudmila died at the age of 38 from a brain tumor on 21 July 1981,five days before her 39th birthday. As the daughter of the communist leader, Zhivkova was accorded a very large public funeral in Bulgaria.

Aftermath

Public places and edifices were named after Lyudmila Zhivkova, yet her ideas on rounded personalities and beauty in public life were removed from public circulation. Todor Zhivkov soon removed most of her protégés from their influential positions. Some of those were accused of misappropriating public funds intended for the arts and the Gallery of World Art, with the 1300 Years of Bulgaria Foundation implicated in serious corruption.

Heritage

Lyudmila Zhivkova's heritage remains disputed in Bulgaria. Some claim that she was the harbinger of alternative ideas, freedom and spirituality, not least through being a woman on Bulgaria's heavily male-dominated public scene. Others see her as the archetypal dissolute, spoilt, confused, imperious, and eternally unfulfilled child of the "Red Bourgeoisie." While her zeal was disturbingly notable on the glacial and ultra-conservative Soviet Bloc scene of the 1970s, today it appears to have brought nothing but minor (and moreover transient) advances, and to have prompted many to "raise their heads above the parapet" only to expose themselves to later persecution.

A point of view which emerged in the 1990s cites Zhivkova's marriage to earthy, hard-nosed, hard-drinking, bon-viveur Ivan Slavkov and her association with the widely compromised 1300 Years of Bulgaria Foundation, ascribing to her features of the post-Communist embezzlers, fraudsters and "kleptocrats" who shared out the spoils of Communist rule in the privatisation campaigns after the 1989 fall of Todor Zhivkov. This minority view reflects the overwhelmingly negative assessments of Zhivkova's father.

Zhivkova left a daughter, Evgeniya (Zheni), from her first marriage to Lybomir Stoychev, and a son, Todor, from her second marriage to Ivan Slavkov, one-time Bulgarian National Television chairman, Bulgarian Olympic Committee president and IOC member. After being adopted by her grandfather, Zheni Zhivkova became a fashion designer and a Coalition for Bulgaria National Assembly deputy.

Trivia

 A boulevard in the capital was named after her (Boulevard Lyudmila Zhivkova), but later renamed after 1990.

References

Sources

 Ташев, Ташо [Tashev, Tasho], „Министрите на България 1879–1999", ["Bulgarian Ministers of State, 1897 to 1999"] Sofia, Професор Марин Дринов/Издателство на Министерството на отбраната [Professor Marin Drinov and Izdatelstvo na ministerstvoto na otbranata], 1999
 Данаилов, Георги [Danailov, Georgi], „Доколкото си спомням" ["Inasmuch as I can recall"] Абагар [Abagar], 2002
 Георгиев, Никола [Georgiev, Nikola], „Нова книга за българския народ" ["A New Book about the Bulgarian Nation"], LiterNet, 2003
 Райнов, Богомил [Raynov, Bogomil], „Людмила — мечти и дела" ["Lyudmila: Dreams and Deeds"], Продуцентска къща 2 1/2 [Produtsentska kushta 2 1/2], 2003.
Ivanka Nedeva Atanasova "Lyudmila Zhivkova and the Paradox of Ideology and Identity in Communist Bulgaria." East European Politics & Societies. Spring 2004, Vol. 18 Issue 2: 278–315.
Clive Leviev-Sawyer,  'Think of me as fire' The Sofia Echo, 4 February 2011. 
Ana Luleva, "The Debate on the Communist Past and the Memory of Lyudmila Zhivkova in Bulgaria," Cultures of History Forum. 
"Lyudmila Zhivkova, Bulgaria Culture Aide" New York Times, Obituaries, 22 July 1981

1942 births
1981 deaths
People from Sofia
Moscow State University alumni
Bulgarian Communist Party politicians
Children of national leaders
Burials at Central Sofia Cemetery
Sofia University alumni
Deaths from brain cancer in Bulgaria